Richard Andrews may refer to:
 Richard Andrews (industrialist) (1798–1859), industrialist and mayor of Southampton
 Richard Andrews (soldier) (died 1835), first rebel killed during the Texas Revolution
 Richard Bullock Andrews (1823–1884), South Australian politician and Supreme Court judge
 Richard G. Andrews (born 1955),  U.S. District Court judge and former state prosecutor in Delaware
 Richard Snowden Andrews (1830–1903), American architect, Confederate artillery commander and diplomat